A Form of Change is the fourth EP by English electronic music duo Simian Mobile Disco.  It was released on 2 October 2012 by Wichita Recordings.

History
The four tracks were taken from their Unpatterns recording sessions. Jas Shaw (in an interview with 7digital), on the behalf of Simian Mobile Disco, said that "they were nearly all goers for the album, but we took them off because we felt it made the whole record too long, and messed with the pacing of it." The track "Everyday" is also an iTunes bonus track on Unpatterns.

Track listing

References

2012 EPs
Albums produced by James Ford (musician)
Simian Mobile Disco albums
Wichita Recordings EPs